The 2014–15 NJIT Highlanders men's basketball team represented the New Jersey Institute of Technology during the 2014–15 NCAA Division I men's basketball season. The Highlanders, led by seventh year head coach Jim Engles, played their home games at the Fleisher Center and were in their second year as an Independent.

On December 6, 2014, NJIT defeated then-#17 Michigan in the program's first game against a top 25 team.

After starting the season with 5 wins and 9 losses in their first 14 games, the Highlanders won 13 of their next 15 games to improve to 18–11 and earn an invitation to the 2015 CollegeInsider.com Postseason Tournament (CIT), the first Division I postseason berth in school history. In the CIT, they defeated New Hampshire, Cleveland State, and Canisius to advance to the semifinals where they lost to Northern Arizona. They finished with a record of 21–12.

This was the Highlanders' final season as a Division I independent; as on July 1, 2015, NJIT joined the Atlantic Sun Conference.

Roster

Schedule

|-
!colspan=9 style="background:#FF0000; color:#000080;"| Regular Season

|-
!colspan=9 style="background:#FF0000; color:#000080;"| CIT

References

NJIT Highlanders men's basketball seasons
Njit
Njit